NBPS can refer to: 

New Brunswick Public Schools
North Broward Preparatory School